Dichodactylus is a genus of Japanese funnel weavers first described by K. I. Okumura in 2017.

Species
 it contains four species:
Dichodactylus inabaensis (Arita, 1974) — Japan
Dichodactylus satoi (Nishikawa, 2003) — Japan
Dichodactylus shinshuensis Okumura, 2017 — Japan
Dichodactylus tarumii (Arita, 1976) — Japan

References

External links

Agelenidae
Araneomorphae genera